The Bhindranwale Tiger Force of Khalistan (BTFK) is a Sikh extremist militant group, and one of several major separatist organizations involved in the Khalistan movement during the Punjab insurgency. The BTFK's main aim was to establish a Sikh homeland called Khalistan. At its peak, the BTFK's membership totaled 500 members and remained the strongest pro-Khalistan group in Tarn Taran Sahib, which was the epicenter of violence during the Punjab insurgency.

It was formed in 1984 by Gurbachan Singh Manochahal.  After Manochahal's death, the BTFK seem to have disbanded or splintered into factions.
It was listed in 1995 as one of the 4 "major militant groups " in the Khalistan movement.

History

Bhindranwale Tiger Force of Khalistan had two main factions, one led by Gurbachan Singh Manochahal and the other faction led by Sukhwinder Singh Sangha.

The BTF was a Sikh group fighting for an independent Sikh homeland.
Based in the state of Punjab, India, the BTF was described as one of the major Sikh revolutionary groups and reportedly the strongest revolutionary group in the Amritsar-Tarn Taran area.

According to Cynthia Keppley Mahmood, who previously was a professor in Anthropology at University of Maine in Orono with expertise on Sikh revolutionary groups in Punjab, the BTF was founded in 1984 by Gurbachan Singh Manochahal, who was also head of the original Panthic Committee (30 December 1994).
Manochal broke away from the original Panthic Committee to continue his independent command of the BTF after his leadership of the Panthic was challenged in 1988.
Manochal also maintained his own Panthic Committee for a while but was killed in 1991 or 1992.
Keppley Mahmood also indicated that membership of the BTF numbered in the hundreds at one point, and the BTF was considered among the most dangerous of the guerilla forces (30 December 1994).
Keppley Mahmood noted that "relations" of suspected members were targeted by police and paramilitary personnel and much of the original force had been decimated.
Furthermore, Keppley Mahmood suggests that members of the BTF were scattered all over, but no one knows how many are left or whether there is a clear leader at this point.
Keppley Mahmood was unable to comment on the treatment of members of the BTF by the authorities upon their return to India, but noted that since the BTF has been a major target of counter-terrorism efforts, she would expect the reception of any known member to be "drastic".

In the year 1991, Bhindranwale Tiger Force of Khalistan along with Khalistan Liberation Force and Dr. Sohan Singh (Head of Panthic Committee) etc. participated in the secret peace negotiations with India in the city of Ludhiana. These meetings were initiated by Union Minister of State for Home Subodh Kant Sahay on the orders of the then Prime Minister of India Chandra Shekhar. It is said that this peace effort was sabotaged by Pakistan's Inter Services Intelligence. Former Indian Intelligence Bureau Joint Director, Maloy Krishna Dhar stated in a press report published by The Hindu, that "Prime Minister Benazir Bhutto and her ISI advisers were determined not to let peace succeed. Pakistan's covert war in Jammu and Kashmir had exploded in 1990, and its establishment understood that the Punjab conflict tied down our troops, and threatened our logistical lines into Jammu and Kashmir."

Gurbachan Singh Manochahal was killed by the police on 1 March 1993.
According to a 30 March 1993 UPI report, Balwinder Singh was appointed as BTF chief after Manochahal's death.

Bhindranwala Tigers Force of Khalistan was found to be active in state of Punjab in the year of 1997.

Ranjit Singh Gill alias Kuki was a Bhindranwale Tiger Force of Khalistan member.

India arrested some of the Bhindranwala Tigers Force of Khalistan members in the year of 1999 as well.

A letter purporting to be from the BTFK claimed responsibility for a bomb blast in Jalandhar in September 2018. BTFK member Dilbag Singh send threat letter to Naamdhari Guru uday singh, jagtar singh, Harvinder singh, Balvinder singh,Surinder singh, advocate Randhawa and Amba on 30 November 2021

See also

 Khalistan Movement
 Kharku

References

Sikh politics
Paramilitary organisations based in India
Pro-Khalistan militant outfits
Sikh terrorism
Designated terrorist organizations associated with Sikhism